The Catholic Church of Latvia is part of the worldwide Catholic Church, under the spiritual leadership of the Pope in Rome.
There are around 476,700 Catholics — around 22.7% of the total population. Catholics in Latvia are mainly found in the easternmost region of Latgale and most are ethnic Latgalians.

History
The Catholic Church has been present in the area that now constitutes the Republic of Latvia since Saint Canute IV in the mid-11th century brought Christianity to Courland and Livonia and the first Christian church was built 1048 in Courland. Bishop Albert of Riga and the Livonian Brothers of the Sword were the first to initiate organized Christianization of all the indigenous people in the early 13th century - at the time tribal cultures like the Curonians, the Latgallians, the Livs, the Selonians and the Semigallians.

Organization
The highest office in the Catholic Church of Latvia was held from 1991 to 2010 by Cardinal Archbishop Jānis Pujats. On 19 June 2010, Pope Benedict XVI accepted the retirement of Archbishop Pujats and appointed Zbigņevs Stankevičs as his successor.

The Catholic Church of Latvia is divided into one archdiocese and three dioceses:
 Archdiocese of Rīga
 Diocese of Jelgava
 Diocese of Liepāja
 Diocese of Rēzekne-Aglona

References and notes

External links
 Romas katoļu baznīca Latvijā
 Catholic Hierarchy

 
Latvia
Latvia